Ayrat Kashaev (born November 23, 1984) is a Russian conductor.

Biography
Born in 1984 in Kazan, Russia, Ayrat Kashaev began his musical training at age four. In 2004, he graduated with honours in choral conducting from Kazan College of Music and entered the Kazan Conservatory. In 2008, Kashaev was invited to continue his education in Moscow Tchaikovsky Conservatory, where he first studied choral conducting with Lev Kontorovitch (graduated in 2009, with honours) and then orchestra conducting with Gennady Rozhdestvensky (graduated in 2012 summa cum laude).

Career
 
Since 2008, Kashaev has been the Principal Conductor of Galina Vishnevskaya College Theatre. In 2011-2013, Kashaev was the Artistic Director of Gnesin College of Music Choir. In April 2013, Kashaev was invited by Gennady Rozhdestvensky to become a conductor at Pokrovsky Chamber Opera. Since 2015, Kashaev has been the Director and Conductor of Taurida National Educational Forum's Symphony Orchestra.

Awards
In 2009, Kashaev won the Russian National Choral Conducting Competition.

References

External links 
Official site

1984 births
Living people
Musicians from Kazan
21st-century Russian conductors (music)
Russian male conductors (music)
21st-century Russian male musicians